Samuel Martins Alves (born June 3, 1989) is a Brazilian singer, who participated in the blind auditions of the fourth season of The Voice, singing "Feeling Good", classic in the voice of Nina Simone. The four coaches (judges) showed they were enjoying it, but none of them pressed the button to choose him.

In December 2013, Sam won the second season of The Voice Brasil (Brazil), and signed with Universal Music Brasil.

Biography 
When he was only two days old, Sam was abandoned in a shoebox at the door of a house in Fortaleza, Ceará. With him, a note written with some writing errors said that he was born on June 3, 1989 and given porridge at 3:00 on June 5, the same day Luiz and Raquel Alves found him. The boy had just turned four when his family decided to move to the United States. The young man grew up and was educated in Massachusetts. His father was a pastor and had done some newspaper delivery routes to make a living. His mother Raquel cleaned houses for a living.

At age 14, his mother, Raquel, started training him to sing in church, and in 2003, the two returned to Brazil for a missionary job. Sam continued to improve, studying at the School of Music of Brasilia, and even recorded an independent gospel album with his sister Samara. In 2007, his mother and him returned to the United States, where their father, Luis, had remained. Within a year, the couple separated and divorced. Sam stayed with his mother, with whom he went through some financial difficulties. Raquel took on two jobs to save the house from foreclosure, while Sam added hours of work to help with the bills at home and still continue going to college seeking his Pre-Med bachelor's degree. He continued to pursue music, but only as a hobby performing at church as a worship leader. He was part of a few his schools chorale, the "Worcester State University Chorale", and took voice lessons with one of the schools vocal coaches. It was in this experience with music in school that his passion went from becoming a doctor, to becoming a singer.

The Voice

The Voice U.S. 
In April 2013 Sam participated in the blind auditions of the fourth season of The Voice (U.S.). He sang "Feeling Good", a classic in Nina Simone's voice. The four judges, Adam Levine, Blake Shelton, Usher and Shakira, all seemed to enjoy it, but none of them pressed the button. Shakira, visibly regretful, told her colleagues she was going to speak in Portuguese: "Eu adorei você. Acho que você é um cantor realmente bom" which means: "I loved you, I think you are a really good singer"."

 The Voice Brasil 
Also in 2013, in October, Sam Alves participated in the blind auditions of The Voice Brasil (Brazil), singing "When I Was Your Man" (Bruno Mars) and caused all four coaches (judges) to turn their chairs. Lulu Santos praised the performance:
 "For me, it was very interesting to see his delivery to his art. You were not doing it for the audience or the camera, you were doing it for you."
Sam chose Cláudia Leitte as his mentor: "I want to sing with her." The song he performed for his audition was made available for digital download on the iTunes Store and charted at number one, ahead of the original Bruno Mars version. In the second phase of the show, Sam battled Marcela Bueno by singing the song "A Thousand Years" and won. The performance of the two was praised by the songwriter and original interpreter of the song, Christina Perri; "Congrats to both of you. that was my favorite cover so far of A THOUSAND YEARS! absolutamente linda!!!" she said. In the tira-teima phase, Sam decided to sing in Portuguese. He performed the song "Pais e Filhos" of the band Legião Urbana. He was saved by the public, along with Júlia Tazzi, and soon after picked by coach Claudia to continue in her team. In his first performance of the LIVE rounds he sang "Mirrors" and was saved by the Brazilian population, with 59% of the votes.
In the semi-final, Sam sang "Você Existe Em Mim", song of his mentor Cláudia Leitte. Alves received 20 points from his coach and 84% of the votes of the public and qualified for the finale of the show.

The finale began with the four finalists singing "Não Quero Dinheiro (Só Quero Amar)" from Tim Maia. In his solo performance, Sam sang "Hallelujah" (Leonard Cohen). Then he performed a duet with his coach Cláudia Leitte, they sang "A Camisa e o Botão". At the end of the program, Sam was announced the winner of the season, with 43% of the popular votes among the more than 29 million votes.

 Filmography 

 Television 

 Discography 

Studio albums 

Singles

 Participations 
 "Pon El Alma En El Juego" – Hit of the Copa América de Chile 2015
 "Intenção" – Duda Ft. Sam Alves (2015)
 "Fôlego" – Dalto Max Ft. Sam Alves (2018)
 "Aquele Amor" – Sam Alves & Freqncy (2019)

 Tours 
 2014: Sam Alves Tour 2015: ID Tour''

Awards and International nominations

References

External links 
 
 
 

1989 births
Living people
People from Fortaleza
21st-century Brazilian male singers
21st-century Brazilian singers
English-language singers from Brazil
Brazilian pop singers
Brazilian composers
Brazilian expatriates in the United States
Brazilian LGBT singers
LGBT people in Latin music
The Voice (franchise) winners